Jørgen Hansen Koch (4 September 1787 – 30 January 1860) was a Neoclassical Danish architect. He was chief of the national Danish building administration from 1835 and director of the Royal Danish Academy of Fine Arts from 1844 to 1849.

Koch and especially his wife Ida Koch were close friends of the writer Hans Christian Andersen, who would typically visit the Koch family on Friday evenings.

Early life and education
Joch was born on 4 September 1787 in Christianshavn, Copenhagen, the son of Jørgen Hansen Koch (1746–1801), a ship builder, and Anne Cathrine née Folkersen (1758–1809). He initially apprenticed as a carpenter. He attended the Royal Danish Academy of Fine Arts from 1807 to 1816 where he studied under Christian Frederik Hansen, the leading Danish architect of the time. In 1818, together with the sculptor Hermann Ernst Freund, he traveled to Rome where he met Bertel Thorvaldsen and other members of the Danish artists' colony who resided in the city at that time. Freund became Thorvaldsen's assistant while Koch later continued to Greece, making him the first Danish architect educated at the Academy to visit the cradle of the Classical architecture which was the period's main source of inspiration for architects. He also visited Constantinople before returning to Italy. In 1822 he returned to Denmark by way of France and London.

Career
Back in Denmark, Koch was appointed Royal Master Builder, succeeding Christian Frederik Hansen as the leader of the national building administration. From 1835 he also held a professorial chair at the Royal Academy and between 1844 and 1849 served as its director.

In 1837 he became part of the Committee for the Foundation of Thorvaldsen's Museum.

He also designed a number of schools, including Frederiksborg Latin School and Roskilde Cathedral School (1842).

In Copenhagen, he designed the Hansen Mansion (1835) in Frederiksstaden.

Family and Hans Christian Andersen link
 
Jørgen Koch was married to Ida Koch née Wulff, daughter of counter admiral  Peter Frederik Wulff (1774–1848) and Hanne Henriette Weinholt (1784–1836). The couple had three sons: Jørgen Hansen Koch (1829–1919), a head teacher, Peter Frederik Koch (1832–1907), a Justitiarius, and Hans Henrik Koch (1836–1903), a naval officer who reached the rank of vice admiral.

 
Jørgen and Ida Koch belonged to Hans Christian Andersen's social circle. Andersen had an open invitation to visit the family for dinner on Fridays. Andersen also developed a friendly relationship with their children which continued after the parents' death, as did the dinner arrangement on Fridays. Andersen also new other members of the Koch and Wulff families.

Herman Wilhelm Bissen created a portrait bust of him in 1835.

Jørgen Hansen Koch died on 30 January 1860 in Copenhagen and is buried in the city's Vestre Cemetery.

Selected works

 Middelfart Town Hall, Middelfart (1823–1826, listed)
 Duebrødre Kloster, Roskilde, Denmark (1841)
 Svendborg Town Hall, Svendborg (1825)
 Hegnetslund, Herfølge (1825)
 Rolighed, Vedbæk (1825)
 Meyers Minde, Krystalgade 12, Copenhagen (1826)
 Borgerskole, Svendborg (1830–1831, demolished)
 Skuldelev Rectory, Skuldelev (1830)
 Quarantine station, Kyholm (1831, demolished in 1859)
 Klitfogedbolig, Skagen (1831–1832)
 Rosenborg Brøndanstalt, Gothersgade 64, Copenhagen (1833, demolished in 1928)
 Frederiksborg Latin School, Sdr. Jernbanevej 4, Hillerød (1834, extension by Ferdinand Meldahl in 1882–1885, listed)
 Hansen Mansion, Fredericiagade 21, Copenhagen (1835, extension by Aage Nielsen in 1957)
 Store Heddinge Town Hall, Store Heddinge (1838, later expanded)
 Gardener's House, Sorgenfri Palace (1840)
 Volkersen House, Jagtvej, Copenhagen (1841, demolished)
 Avlsbygninger, Bregentved (1841, demolished)
 Kærup Manor, Benløse (1841–1842)
 Roskilde Cathedral School, Roskilde (1842, adapted in 1980, listed)
 Helsingør Customs House, Helsingør (1844, demolished in 1889)
 Rudkøbing Town Hall, Rudkøbing (1845)
 Ringsted Town Hall, Ringsted (1845)
 Odense Cathedral School, Odense (1845–1846)
 Reykjavík Latin School, Reykjavík (1845)
 Farmhouse, Iceland
 Own house, stable and carriagehouse, Ny Kongensgade 15, Copenhagen (1847, demolished)
 Farmhouse, Vallø Castle (1852)
 Farmhouse, Vallø (1854)
 Voldbro, Vallø Castle (1856)

Extensions, adaptions and refurbishments

 Royal Danish Academy of Surgery, Bredgade 62, Copenhagen (1823)
 Sæby Church, Sæby, Hornsherred (1823)
 Lindegården, Hornsherred (1827, demolished)
 Extension of Royal Danish Library, Copenhagen (1827, 20 columns and other elements now in Museet på Koldinghus)
 Holstein Mansion, Stormgade 10, Copenhagen (1827)
 Fasangården, Frederiksberg Park (1828)
 Amalienborg, Brockdorff's Palace, Copenhagen (1827–1828)
Moltke Mansion, proposed change
 , Bredgade 42, Copenhagen (1829)
 Charlottenlund Palace, Copenhagen
 Frederiksberg Palace, Copenhagen (1828)
 Gatehouse at Frederiksborg Palace, construction of gate building (1829)
 Justo, Frederiksberg Park, Frederiksberg (1834, extended and altered by Christian Klingsey 1900)
 Stændersal, Viborg (1834)
 Stændersal, Roskilde (1835, Yellow Mansion)
 Cantor's House, Vallø (1836)
 Royal Danish Theatre, Copenhagen (1837, demolished in 1874)
 Elers Kollegium, Store Kannikestræde 9, Copenhagen (1837)
 Kiel Palace (1838, demolished after WW2 bombing)
 Odense Slot, southeast wing (1837), garden, smst. (1840) and interior, smst. (1841)
 Frederiksgave, Assens, Denmark (1841)
 Court Theatre, Christiansborg Ridehus, Copenhagen (1842)
 Gottorp Castle (1842)
 Yellow Mansion, Amaliegade 18, Copenhagen (1842)
 Bernstorff Palace, Jægersborg Allé (1844)
 Aarhus Cathedral School, Skolegyde, Aarhus (1847–1849, expanded by Hack Kampmann 1904, C.F. Møller 1957)
 Slagelse Hospital, south wing, Slagelse (1848)
 Ladegården, new wing, Frederiksberg (1848, demolished 1930)
 Frederiksborg Castle, Badstuen, along with barracks and stables (1849)
 Prince's Mansion, Copenhagen (1849, now Nationalmuseet)
 Børsen, Copenhagen

Unrealized projects
 Theater and yard (1824)
 Hellerupgård, veranda (1825)
 Warehouse (1827)
 Manor and stable (1829)
 City hall (awarded, 1833)
 Thorvaldsen's Museum (1839, competition submission)
 More designs for pavilions (1842 and undated)
 Main building (1850)
 Designs for prisons and jails (1840)
 Furniture; royal sarcophagus (1850)

Other works
 Decoration for Adam Wilhelm Moltke's wedding (1823)
 Living room at Bregentved (1824)

Burial monuments
 Tombstone for  Niels Rosenkrantz, Rye Kirke (1824)
 Tombstone for Minna von Witzleben, Vemmetofte (1849)
 Sarcophagus for doctor , St. Peter's Church (1824)
 Sarcophagus for landgrave  (1834)
 Sarcophagus for Christian VIII (1848, Roskilde Domkirke)

Written works 
 , Kunstforeningen, Copenhagen 1834.

See also
 List of Danish architects
 Architecture of Denmark

References

External links

Architects from Copenhagen
1787 births
1860 deaths
Royal Danish Academy of Fine Arts alumni
Directors of the Royal Danish Academy of Fine Arts
Commanders First Class of the Order of the Dannebrog
Burials at Assistens Cemetery (Copenhagen)